Roches Beach is a rural residential locality in the local government area (LGA) of Clarence in the Hobart LGA region of Tasmania. The 2021 Census recorded a population of 220 for the state suburb of Roches Beach. It is a suburb of Hobart, between Lauderdale and Acton Park.

History 
Roches Beach was gazetted as a locality in 1958. It was named for an early settler.

Geography
The waters of Frederick Henry Bay form the eastern boundary.

Road infrastructure 
Route C330 (Acton Road) passes to the west. From there, Roches Beach Road provides access to the locality.

References

Beaches of Tasmania
Localities of City of Clarence